The Unison Tour is the third concert tour by Celine Dion. The tour was organized to support her ninth studio album Unison (1990). Dion performed her show 75 times in Canada

History
The tour had three legs. At first Céline Dion toured Quebec, starting in October 1990 in Drummondville and ending on 6 December 1990 in Quebec City. During one of the shows on 13 October 1990 in Sherbrooke Dion lost her voice for the second time (first time was during the Incognito tournée). Because of laryngitis, Dion had to postpone next three concerts in Montreal, between 16–18 October 1990.

On 20 December 1990 it was announced that Dion has postponed the rest of her concert tour for a two-month period. She still suffered the effects of a bout with laryngitis, coupled with exhaustion from a series of performances at Theatre St. Denis. Performances in Quebec City, Sherbrooke, Ottawa and Trois-Rivières, scheduled for January and February, were rescheduled in the spring. Celine wrote on that experience: "I had to begin the Unison tour by doing four shows in a row for my wonderful Quebecois audience. Two in Drum-mondville and two in Sherbrooke. The tragedy happened on the third night. My voice broke all of a sudden. It came apart like wet paper. It was like entering a vacuum, total darkness. I felt as if I were blowing into a punctured balloon. At that moment I believed my voice would never return. Or that it would come back completely undone, changed, unrecognizable. During a guitar solo, I gave a signal to the stage manager that I could not go on. Rene went onstage to tell the audience what had happened and to assure them that I´d come back to the show later, in a few days or weeks, as soon as I could. Then people began to applaud. They stood up to show me their sympathy and support. After that, I dissolved into tears."

Later, she started the tour in the English-speaking Canada, which lasted between February and April 1991.

During the third leg, between 19 May and 9 October 1991 Dion gave 37 concerts in 25 different cities.

She ended her tour in Quebec, performing in Quebec City on 31 August 1991.

Opening acts
 Francois Massicotte (select dates)

Set list
 "Love by Another Name"
 "If Love Is Out the Question"
 "Have a Heart"
 "Délivre-moi"
 "D'abord, c'est quoi l'amour?"
 "I Feel Too Much"
 "Hello Mégo"
 "Can't Live with You, Can't Live Without You"
 "Calling You"
 "(If There Was) Any Other Way"
 "The Last to Know"
 "Unison"
 "Where Does My Heart Beat Now"

Known tour dates

Broadcasts and recordings

The 1991 show at the Winter Garden Theatre in Toronto, Ontario, Canada was filmed and aired on MusiMax. Three songs from that concert: "Délivre-moi", "Have a Heart", and "Calling You" were included later on the Unison home video.

On 19 June 1991 Céline Dion gave a special, sold out one night "Ten Year Career Concert" at the Montreal Forum (16,000 spectators), where she was accompanied by the Montreal Symphony Orchestra.

Personnel

Production
 Management: René Angélil, Feeling Productions Inc.
 Tour Manager: Suzanne Gingue
 Lighting Design: Yves Aucoin
 Lighting Director: Eric Lapointe
 Intellabeam Technician: Steve Baird
 Lighting Technician: Adrian Pascau
 House Sound: Yves Savoies
 Monitors: Charles Ethier
 Band Gear: Jean-Francois Dubois
 Thanks: Concert Productions International, Donald K. Donald Productions

Band
 Keyboards, Vocals, Guitars: Claude "Mégo" Lemay
 Drums: Peter Barbeau
 Bass: Sylvain Bolduc
 Keyboards: Yves Frulla
 Guitars: Pierre Gauthier

References

Celine Dion concert tours
1990 concert tours
1991 concert tours